Here Lies Love is a concept album and rock musical made in collaboration between David Byrne and Fatboy Slim, about the life of the former First Lady of the Philippines Imelda Marcos along with the woman who raised her—Estrella Cumpas—and follows Marcos until she and her family were forced to leave the Philippines. The album features 22 guest vocalists and was released on 5 April 2010, under Nonesuch Records and Todomundo in several formats, including a deluxe double-Compact Disc set with a DVD of music videos from the album and a 120-page book.

The album was adapted as a rock musical that premiered in 2013 off-Broadway at The Public Theater and ran again at the Public in 2014–2015. It also played at the Royal National Theatre's Dorfman Theatre in 2014–2015 and the Seattle Repertory Theatre in 2017. It will have its Broadway premiere in the summer of 2023.

Background
The title of the album is taken from a comment made by Imelda during a visit to her husband Ferdinand Marcos's embalmed body. Imelda expressed that she would like the phrase "Here Lies Love" to be inscribed on her tombstone. David Byrne released the following statement regarding this album:

Recording and release

The studio album features female singers including Cyndi Lauper, Tori Amos, Martha Wainwright, Natalie Merchant, Sia, Santigold, Charmaine Clamor, Nicole Atkins, Sharon Jones, St. Vincent,  Kate Pierson, Florence Welch, Allison Moorer, and Nellie McKay, alternately playing the roles of Imelda Marcos and Estrella Cumpas. "It's a series of 22 very danceable songs…" wrote Byrne, "…and is sung by 20, count 'em, 20, amazing singers. A theater piece for your ears."

Byrne described Cyndi Lauper's performance as "amazingly fine-tuned" and "very impressive." The only male vocalists are Steve Earle on "A Perfect Hand", and Byrne himself on "American Troglodyte" and "Seven Years", the latter a duet with Shara Nova from My Brightest Diamond.

The first promotional single was "Please Don't", featuring Santigold on vocals. The single became available on Byrne's website as a free high-quality MP3 download on 19 January 2010.

Live performances

Here Lies Love was performed live four times before the album was released. It was first presented as a song cycle (with vocals by Byrne, Dana Diaz-Tutaan and Ganda Suthivarakom) at the Adelaide Festival of Arts under the artistic direction of Brett Sheehy in Adelaide, Australia, on 10 March 2006 with additional dates on 13 and 14 March, and was also performed live at the Carnegie Hall in New York City on 3 February 2007, as part of the Carnegie Hall Perspectives Series.

Track listing

Stage adaptation

The album was adapted into a stage musical, directed by Alex Timbers, that premiered off-Broadway at The Public Theater in New York City in 2013.  It starred Ruthie Ann Miles in the title role, with Jose Llana as Ferdinand Marcos and Conrad Ricamora as Ninoy Aquino. The production played an extended run at the Public before closing in August 2013. It returned for an open-ended commercial run again at the Public in April 2014. The production closed at the Public on January 4, 2015. The production won five Lucille Lortel Awards in 2014.

The musical, directed once again by Timbers, opened at the Royal National Theatre in September 2014, and played a limited, sold-out run through January 2015 at the National's newly renovated Dorfman Theatre. The London-based production was nominated for three Olivier Awards in 2015 (Best New Musical, Outstanding Achievement in Music, and Best Theatre Choreographer).

A revamped production from the original Off-Broadway creative team, with the intention of recreating the immersive elements in a proscenium theater, was staged at the Seattle Repertory Theater from April 7 to May 28, 2017 (extended to June 18 after strong ticket sales). Notable returning actors included Conrad Ricamora and Melody Butiu reprising their roles from the original Off-Broadway cast as Ninoy Aquino and Estrella Cumpas, respectively, Mark Bautista from the London cast reprising his role as Ferdinand Marcos, and replacement actor Jaygee Macapugay reprising her role as Imelda Marcos from the Off-Broadway cast.

The musical will have its Broadway premiere in 2023, produced by Hal Luftig, Patrick Catullo, Diana DiMenna, Clint Ramos and Jose Antonio Vargas. It again will recreate the immersive experience with a mostly standing-room format which the producers say will “transform the venue’s traditional proscenium floor space into a dance club environment, where audiences will stand and move with the actors.”

References

External links

David Byrne's homepage on Here Lies Love

Here Lies Love at Metacritic

2006 musicals
2007 musicals
2010 soundtrack albums
2010 video albums
Albums produced by David Byrne
Art rock soundtracks
Collaborative albums
Concept albums
David Byrne soundtracks
David Byrne video albums
Disco soundtracks
Fatboy Slim albums
Imelda Marcos
Nonesuch Records soundtracks
Nonesuch Records video albums
Theatre soundtracks
Todo Mundo soundtracks
Todo Mundo video albums
2014 soundtrack albums
Cast recordings
Disco video albums
Art rock video albums
Musicals inspired by real-life events